The Seattle Gay News is a weekly newspaper aimed at the Seattle and Puget Sound  area LGBT community in the U.S. state of Washington.

History
Seattle Gay News was founded in 1974 by Jim Tully and Jim Anderson. As of 2022, the SGN is distributed to every library in the King County Library System, Seattle Public Library System, and Pierce County Library System, as well as roughly 115 other locations in Seattle and Tacoma.

Former editor George Bakan was an LGBTQ+ activist in Seattle and acted as head of the SGN from 1984 until his death in 2020.

SGN files are preserved in the Washington State History Museum in Tacoma. The SGN is also currently being archived by Yale University, University of Washington Seattle in Seattle, and the Seattle Public Library System. Microfiche copies of the archives can be found at UW and the Seattle Public Library.

In 2021, staff began restructuring of the paper to improve its diversity and inclusivity. In the same year, SGN launched a podcast as part of the restructuring effort.

References

External links
 

LGBT culture in Seattle
LGBT-related newspapers published in the United States
Newspapers published in Seattle
1974 establishments in Washington (state)